Sandakan Japanese Cemetery is an old graveyard in Sandakan, Sabah, Malaysia. Located on a hill about 2 kilometres from the town central business district, it is a cemetery where the remains of many Japanese female prostitutes called Karayuki-san from poverty-stricken agricultural prefectures in Japan who were sold into slavery at a very young age years before the World War II which also include recent comfort women during the war. It is part of the Sandakan Heritage Trail.

History 
The cemetery was founded in 1890 by Madam Kinoshita Kuni (born 7 July 1854) from Futae Village, Amakusa County, Kumamoto Prefecture, a successful Japanese female manager of Sandakan's lucrative '' for Japanese prostitutes who died in the business with most of the graves belonged to women. Madam Okuni is a very influential and kind woman who fluent in English with many Yamato nadeshiko (Japanese girls) sought her guidance and protection with the treatment as a human beings of the girls in her brothel were much better than in the other Japanese brothels in Sandakan where she is called as the "Okuni" of South Seas. Herself was raised from a poor family before becoming the mistress of an Englishman in Yokohama at a young age. When her husband returned to England, she moved to Sandakan and opening a general store including a brothel.

In 1891, there were already 20 brothels and 71 Japanese prostitutes in Sandakan. The cemetery built by Okuni is for to pray for the souls of Japanese who died in Sandakan where herself had a place reserved in the cemetery when she is still alive; showing that she intended to lived permanently in Sandakan and did not want to return to Japan with all of the grave stones in the cemetery were directly ordered from her homeland country. The cemetery subsequently become famous among Japanese visitors, including those from Jesselton and Tawau as they will stop on the cemetery to pray for the deceased before proceeding their journey. A book published in 1972 by Japanese writer Tomoko Yamazaki made a mention that the cemetery used to have hundreds Japanese graves which include a monument erected in 1989 for fallen Japanese soldiers during the World War II as an addition to the cemetery.

Features 
A majority of the cemetery are belong to Karayuki-san, mainly daughters of poor Japanese people with no social status or value as female where they been exported overseas as maids to work before being forced into prostitution activities. Those who buried in the cemetery are with their feet pointing towards the direction of Japan as a posture or gesture that condemns their ancestral home that abandoned them or exhorted them to support their country war efforts which is considered as an ultimate insult.

See also 
 Sandakan No. 8

References

Further reading

External links 
 

Cemeteries in Malaysia
Monuments and memorials in Sabah
World War II memorials